Andrew James Hickey (August 27, 1872 – August 20, 1942) was an American lawyer and politician who served six terms as a U.S. Representative from Indiana from 1919 to 1931.

Biography 
Born in Albion, New York, Hickey attended the public schools of his native city and Buffalo (New York) Law School.  He was admitted to the New York bar in 1896 and commenced practice in La Porte, Indiana, in 1897.

Congress 
Hickey was elected as a Republican to the Sixty-sixth and to the five succeeding Congresses (March 4, 1919 – March 3, 1931).  He was an unsuccessful candidate for reelection in 1930 to the Seventy-second Congress, for election in 1934 to the Seventy-fourth Congress, and in 1936 to the Seventy-fifth Congress.

Later career and death 
He resumed the practice of law.  He died in Buffalo, New York, August 20, 1942, while on a motor trip.  He was interred in Pine Lake Cemetery, La Porte, Indiana. Hickey had one brother, New York politician and judge William J. Hickey, who outlived him by a decade.

References

1872 births
1942 deaths
New York (state) lawyers
Indiana lawyers
People from Albion, Orleans County, New York
People from La Porte, Indiana
Republican Party members of the United States House of Representatives from Indiana